Norma Amanda "Chuchi" Abdala de Matarazzo (born 13 April 1948) is an Argentine politician who sat as a member of the Argentine Chamber of Deputies from 2009 to 2021. She served as Second Vice President of the Chamber from 2011 to 2015. Since 2021, she has been a member of the Santiago del Estero provincial legislature.

She was born in Ingeniero Forres, Santiago del Estero into a family of Lebanese descent. She served as intendente (mayor) of Fernández from 2002 to 2009, and has been vice-president of the Santiago del Estero Justicialist Party since 2015.

References

Living people
Members of the Argentine Chamber of Deputies elected in Santiago del Estero
Members of the Chamber of Deputies of Santiago del Estero
Argentine people of Lebanese descent
Women members of the Argentine Chamber of Deputies
People from Santiago del Estero Province
People from Fernández, Santiago del Estero
Mayors of places in Argentina
1948 births
21st-century Argentine women politicians
21st-century Argentine politicians